Cock o' the North is a whisky liqueur, owned by the Gordon Clan of Aboyne Castle, Aberdeenshire. It has been produced under contract at the Speyside Distillery facility at Kingussie, Speyside.

History 
Cock o' the North Liqueur is named for the Chief of the Gordon Clan who has been known for centuries as 'The Cock o' the North'. According to family legends, the Gordon's used to make a drink based on whisky and blaeberry (Scottish Blueberry) together with other special ingredients, to sustain them on long journeys, in battle and to welcome guests.

Cock o' the North is currently made from a single malt from Speyside in the smallest distillery in Scotland.

References

Liqueurs
Scottish liqueurs
Aberdeenshire